Samingdet Nor.Anuwatgym (สมิงเดช น.อนุวัฒน์ยิม) is a Thai Muay Thai fighter. He is the current WBC Muaythai Super Featherweight World champion.

Muay Thai career
In April 2019, he took on the #6 ranked Lumpini bantamweight Detchaiya Petchyindee at the Rajadamnern Stadium. Samingdet won the fight by a third round TKO.

Samingdet fought for the 118lbs True4u Muaymumwansuek title against Yothin FA Group in August 2019. The fight ended in a decision draw.

Samingdet was scheduled to fight Dechsakda Sor-Jor Tongprajin in the Rangsit Stadium for the vacant WBC Muaythai World Super Featherweight title in July 2020. The fight was cancelled as Dechsakda had complications cutting weight, and had to be transported to the hospital. The fight was rescheduled for September 2020. He put in a dominating performance, winning the first two rounds 10-9 on the judges' scorecards, before knocking Dechsakda out in the third round with a left elbow.

Titles and accomplishments
World Boxing Council Muay Thai
 2020 WBC Muay Thai World 130 lbs Champion
Rajadamnern Stadium
 2020 Rajadamnern Stadium 130 lbs Champion
True4U Petchyindee
 2022 True4U 130 lbs Champion

Fight record

|- style="background:#cfc;"
| 2023-02-27|| Win ||align=left| Khim Bora || Kun Khmer All Star || Phnom Penh, Cambodia || Decision ||  3|| 
|- style="background:#cfc;"
| 2023-02-16|| Win ||align=left| Flukenoi Kiatfahlikit || Petchyindee, Rajadamnern Stadium || Bangkok, Thailand || Decision ||  5|| 3:00

|-  style="background:#fbb;"
| 2022-11-12|| Loss ||align=left| Tongnoi Wor.Sangprapai  || Muay Thai Vithee Tin Thai + Petchyindee Sanjorn|| Chiang Rai province, Thailand || KO || 5||

|-  style="background:#cfc;"
| 2022-10-21 || Win ||align=left| NuengUbon Or.Atchariya || Muaymanwansuk, Rangsit Stadium || Pathum Thani, Thailand || KO (Elbows)|| 3||
|-

|-  style="background:#cfc;"
| 2022-09-17 || Win ||align=left| Songkom Bangkokalaiyon|| Muay Thai Witee Tin Thai Muang Nam Dam || Kalasin Province, Thailand || KO (Left Elbow) ||3 ||

|-  style="background:#fbb;"
| 2022-07-01 || Loss ||align=left| Kompatak Or.Atchariya|| True4U Muaymanwansuk, Rangsit Stadium || Pathum Thani, Thailand ||Decision ||5 ||3:00 
|-
! style=background:white colspan=9 |
|-  style="background:#fbb;"
| 2022-05-12 || Loss ||align=left| Chorfah Tor.Sangtiennoi ||Petchyindee, Rajadamnern Stadium || Bangkok, Thailand || Decision || 5 || 3:00
|-  style="background:#fbb;"
| 2022-03-24 || Loss ||align=left| Nabil VenumMuayThai|| Petchyindee, Rajadamnern Stadium || Bangkok, Thailand || Decision || 5||3:00
|-  style="background:#cfc;"
| 2022-02-11 || Win ||align=left| Kompatak Or.Atchariya|| True4U Muaymanwansuk, Rangsit Stadium || Pathum Thani, Thailand || Decision|| 5||3:00 
|-
! style=background:white colspan=9 |
|-  style="background:#c5d2ea;"
| 2021-12-16 || Draw||align=left| Flukenoi Kiatfahlikit || Petchyindee, Rangsit Stadium || Rangsit, Thailand || Decision ||5 || 3:00

|-  style="background:#fbb;"
| 2021-03-11 || Loss||align=left| Kompatak SinbiMuayThai ||True4U Muaymanwansuk, Rangsit Stadium || Pathum Thani, Thailand || Decision ||5 || 3:00
|-  style="background:#fbb;"
| 2020-10-23 || Loss||align=left| Rangkhao Wor.Sangprapai ||True4U Muaymanwansuk, Rangsit Stadium || Pathum Thani, Thailand || Decision ||5 || 3:00
|-  style="background:#cfc;"
| 2020-09-18 || Win ||align=left| Dechsakda Sor-Jor Tongprajin || Petchyindee, Rangsit Stadium || Pathum Thani, Thailand || KO (Left Elbow) ||3 || 
|-
! style=background:white colspan=9 |
|-  style="background:#cfc;"
| 2020-07-10 || Win||align=left| Thanapetch Wor.Sangprapai ||True4U Muaymanwansuk, Rangsit Stadium ||Pathum Thani, Thailand ||Decision ||5 || 3:00
|-  style="background:#fbb;"
| 2020-01-31|| Loss ||align=left| Pompetch Sor.Samakphong || Phuket Super Fight Real Muay Thai || Mueang Phuket District, Thailand || Decision ||5 || 3:00
|-  style="background:#cfc;"
| 2020-01-02|| Win ||align=left| Thanapetch Wor.Sangprapai ||  Rajadamnern Stadium ||Bangkok, Thailand || KO (Left Elbow)|| 3 || 
|-
! style=background:white colspan=9 |
|-  style="background:#cfc;"
| 2019-11-21 || Win||align=left| Yothin FA Group || Rajadamnern Stadium || Bangkok, Thailand || Decision || 5 || 3:00
|-  style="background:#cfc;"
| 2019-10-24|| Win ||align=left| Fluknoi Muayded789 ||  Rajadamnern Stadium ||Bangkok, Thailand || KO (Left Elbow)|| 4 ||
|-  style="background:#fbb;"
| 2019-10-03|| Loss ||align=left| Yothin FA Group ||  Rajadamnern Stadium ||Bangkok, Thailand || Decision  || 5 || 3:00
|-  style="background:#c5d2ea;"
| 2019-08-09|| Draw ||align=left| Yothin FA Group || Petchyindee True4U Lumpinee Stadium ||Bangkok, Thailand || Decision  || 5 || 3:00
|-
! style=background:white colspan=9 |
|-  style="background:#cfc;"
| 2019-06-13|| Win ||align=left| Detchaiya PetchyindeeAcademy || Rajadamnern Stadium || Bangkok, Thailand || TKO (Right Elbow)|| 3 ||
|-  style="background:#cfc;"
| 2019-04-04|| Win ||align=left| Puenkol Diamond98 || Rajadamnern Stadium || Bangkok, Thailand || Decision || 5 || 3:00 
|-
! style=background:white colspan=9 |
|-  style="background:#fbb;"
| 2019-03-01|| Loss ||align=left| Boonlong PetchyindeeAcademy || Lumpinee Stadium ||Bangkok, Thailand || Decision  || 5 || 3:00
|-  style="background:#c5d2ea;"
| 2019-01-30|| Draw ||align=left| Kimluay Santi-Ubon ||  Lumpinee Stadium ||Bangkok, Thailand || Decision  || 5 || 3:00
|-  style="background:#cfc;"
| 2018-12-26|| Win ||align=left| Boonlong PetchyindeeAcademy || Rajadamnern Stadium || Bangkok, Thailand || Decision || 5 || 3:00
|-  style="background:#cfc;"
| 2018-11-26|| Win ||align=left| Thongnoi Lukbanyai || Rajadamnern Stadium || Bangkok, Thailand || KO (Left High Kick)|| 4 ||
|-  style="background:#cfc;"
| 2018-10-10|| Win ||align=left| Thongnoi Lukbanyai || Rajadamnern Stadium || Bangkok, Thailand || KO (Left Elbow)|| 3 ||
|-  style="background:#cfc;"
| 2018-09-13|| Win ||align=left| Kimluay Santi-Ubon || Rajadamnern Stadium || Bangkok, Thailand || Decision || 5 || 3:00
|-  style="background:#cfc;"
| 2018-08-17|| Win ||align=left| Yodwitthaya Sor.Sirilak || Rajadamnern Stadium || Bangkok, Thailand || Decision || 5 || 3:00
|-  style="background:#cfc;"
| 2018-07-06|| Win ||align=left| Kaemphet Pumphanmuang  || Rajadamnern Stadium || Bangkok, Thailand || Decision || 5 || 3:00
|-  style="background:#fbb;"
| 2018-04-09|| Loss ||align=left| Saenson Erawan  || Rajadamnern Stadium || Bangkok, Thailand || KO (Knees to the thigh) || 4 ||
|-  style="background:#fbb;"
| 2018-01-10|| Loss ||align=left| Thongnoi Lukbanyai || Rajadamnern Stadium || Bangkok, Thailand || Decision || 5 || 3:00
|-  style="background:#fbb;"
| 2017-12-01|| Loss||align=left| Yokmorakot Wor.Sangpapai || Rajadamnern Stadium || Bangkok, Thailand || TKO (Doctor Stoppage)|| 4 ||
|-  style="background:#cfc;"
| 2017-11-10|| Win||align=left| Thongnoi Lukbanyai  || True4u Rangsit Stadium||Rangsit, Thailand || Decision || 5 || 3:00
|-  style="background:#cfc;"
| 2017-09-22|| Win||align=left| Numthai Phetnongki || True4u Rangsit Stadium||Rangsit, Thailand || TKO (Referee Stoppage) || 4 ||
|-  style="background:#cfc;"
| 2017-08-25|| Win||align=left| Yodsiam FighterMuaythai || True4u Rangsit Stadium||Rangsit, Thailand || Decision || 5 || 3:00
|-  style="background:#fbb;"
| 2017-07-06|| Loss||align=left| Khemphet Poomphanmuang || Rajadamnern Stadium || Bangkok, Thailand || KO || 3 ||
|-  style="background:#fbb;"
| 2017-05-29|| Loss||align=left| Dodoh Lookkhokrak || Rajadamnern Stadium || Bangkok, Thailand || KO || 3 ||
|-  style="background:#cfc;"
| 2017-04-14|| Win||align=left| Yodsiam FighterMuaythai || True4u Rangsit Stadium||Pathum Thani, Thailand || KO || 2 ||
|-  style="background:#cfc;"
| 2017-02-03|| Win||align=left| Jaroenphon Popthirathum || True4u Rangsit Stadium||Pathum Thani, Thailand || KO (Left Elbow) || 4 ||
|-  style="background:#fbb;"
| 2017-01-06|| Loss||align=left| Saenson Erawan  || True4u Rangsit Stadium||Pathum Thani, Thailand || Decision || 5 || 3:00
|-  style="background:#fbb;"
| 2016-11-25|| Loss||align=left| Praewprao PetchyindeeAcademy  || True4u Rangsit Stadium||Pathum Thani, Thailand || KO ||2 ||   
|-
! style=background:white colspan=9 |
|-  style="background:#cfc;"
| 2016-10-05|| Win ||align=left| Rit Sor.Visetkit   || Rajadamnern Stadium || Bangkok, Thailand || Decision || 5 || 3:00
|-  style="background:#fbb;"
| 2016-08-29|| Loss ||align=left| Thongrob Lukbanyai  || Rajadamnern Stadium || Bangkok, Thailand || KO || 4 ||
|-  style="background:#cfc;"
| 2016-08-01|| Win ||align=left| Rit Sor.Visetkit   || Rajadamnern Stadium || Bangkok, Thailand || KO || 4 ||
|-  style="background:#cfc;"
| 2016-05-18|| Win ||align=left| Robert Fightermuaythai  || Rajadamnern Stadium || Bangkok, Thailand || KO || 4 ||
|-  style="background:#cfc;"
| 2016-04-25|| Win ||align=left| Pepsi Or.Prasert || Rajadamnern Stadium || Bangkok, Thailand || Decision || 5 || 3:00
|-  style="background:#cfc;"
| 2016-03-07|| Win ||align=left| Prabphairi PookongyadsubDomsuk || Rajadamnern Stadium || Bangkok, Thailand || KO || 2 ||
|-  style="background:#cfc;"
| 2016-02-17|| Win ||align=left| Phetsakol Sitballsakol99 || Rajadamnern Stadium || Bangkok, Thailand || KO || 3 ||
|-  style="background:#fbb;"
| 2016-01-09|| Loss ||align=left| Sangfah Nor.Anuwatgym || Lumpinee Stadium || Bangkok, Thailand || Decision || 5 || 3:00
|-  style="background:#fbb;"
| 2015-11-30|| Loss ||align=left| Sangfah Nor.Anuwatgym || Rajadamnern Stadium || Bangkok, Thailand || Decision || 5 || 3:00
|-  style="background:#cfc;"
| 2015-10-27|| Win ||align=left| Sangsakda Teemuangloei || Lumpinee Stadium || Bangkok, Thailand || Decision || 5 || 3:00
|-  style="background:#cfc;"
| 2015-08-03|| Win ||align=left| Paingern Singnawa-Awute || Rajadamnern Stadium || Bangkok, Thailand || Decision || 5 || 3:00
|-  style="background:#cfc;"
| 2015-07-03|| Win ||align=left| Paingern Singnawa-Awute || Lumpinee Stadium || Bangkok, Thailand || Decision || 5 || 3:00 
|-
| colspan=9 | Legend:    

|-  style="background:#fbb;"
| 2021-12-10 || Loss||align=left| Jalil Barnes || 2021 IFMA World Championships U-23, Semi Finals || Bangkok, Thailand || Decision (Split)|| 3 ||

|-  style="background:#cfc;"
| 2021-12-09 || Win ||align=left| Márk Rehák || 2021 IFMA World Championships U-23, Quarter Finals || Bangkok, Thailand || TKO ||  ||

|-  style="background:#cfc;"
| 2021-12-08 || Win ||align=left| David Sinclair || 2021 IFMA World Championships U-23, Round 2 || Bangkok, Thailand || Decision || 3 ||
|-
| colspan=9 | Legend:

See also
 List of male kickboxers

References

1999 births
Samingdet Nor.Anuwatgym
Living people
Samingdet Nor.Anuwatgym